Tlalnepantla is a commuter railway station serving the Ferrocarril Suburbano, a suburban rail that connects the State of Mexico with Mexico City. The station is located in the municipality of Tlalnepantla, State of Mexico, north of Mexico City.

General information
Tlalnepantla station is located between the San Javier and Ceylan neighborhoods in the Tlalnepantla municipality, State of Mexico. It is the third station of the system going northbound from Buenavista and the first one to be located in the State of Mexico. The station is located relatively close to downtown Tlalnepantla.

As with Mexico City Metro, each station of the Ferrocarril Suburbano has a pictogram. Tlalnepantla's pictogram depicts the façade of the pyramid of Santa Cecilia Acatitlán, an archeological zone in Tlalnepantla discovered between 1923 and 1924.

The station opened on 2 June 2008 as part of the first stretch of system 1 of the Ferrocarril Suburbano, going from Buenavista in Mexico City to the Lechería station in the State of Mexico.

Station layout

References

2008 establishments in Mexico
Tlalnepantla
Railway stations opened in 2008
Tlalnepantla de Baz
Buildings and structures in the State of Mexico